20 teams took part in the league with FC Spartak Moscow winning the championship.

Round 1

Group A

Table

Results

Group B

Table

Results

Round 2

Places 1–14

Table

Results

Top scorers
16 goals
 Dzhemal Kherhadze (Torpedo Kutaisi)
 Nikolai Osyanin (Spartak Moscow)
 Vladimir Proskurin (SKA Rostov-on-Don)

12 goals
 Galimzyan Khusainov (Spartak Moscow)

11 goals
 Ruslan Abdullayev (Neftchi)

10 goals
 Givi Nodia (Dinamo Tbilisi)

9 goals
 Yuri Avrutskiy (Dynamo Moscow)
 Anatoli Shakun (Zorya)
 Yuri Semin (Dynamo Moscow)

8 goals
 Vitaly Khmelnitsky (Dynamo Kyiv)
 Vladimir Larin (Dynamo Moscow)
 Valeri Maslov (Dynamo Moscow)
 David Pais (Torpedo Moscow)
 Anatoliy Puzach (Dynamo Kyiv)
 Viktor Serebryannikov (Dynamo Kyiv)

Places 15–20

Table

Results

Top scorers
14 goals
 Oganes Zanazanyan (Ararat)

13 goals
 Boris Kazakov (Krylia Sovetov)

9 goals
 Nikolai Kazaryan (Ararat)

8 goals
 Rudolf Atamalyan (Lokomotiv Moscow)
 Vyacheslav Bektashev (Pakhtakor)
 Gennadi Krasnitsky (Pakhtakor)

References

 Soviet Union - List of final tables (RSSSF)

1969
1
Soviet
Soviet